Kue bangkit is a small biscuit (kue or kuih) that made from sago starch of Malay origin, commonly found in Indonesia and Malaysia. This biscuit has various colours, ranging from white, yellowish to brown, depends on the additional ingredients.

In Indonesia, kue bangkit is associated with Malays community of Riau and Riau Islands provinces. While in Malaysia, kuih bangkit is associated with Malays and Nyonya communities. It is one of the typical traditional Malay cookie, mostly associated with Hari Raya and Chinese New Year.

Etymology
This coconut sago cookie is called as kue bangkit in Indonesia, and kuih bangkit in Malaysia. The term bangkit in Malay language means "rise" refer to the fact that the biscuit expands twice the size after baking.

Ingredients
Kue bangkit ingredients consists of sago or tapioca starch, thick coconut milk, sugar, egg yolks, pandan leaf, margarine and salt. Sometimes vanilla extract and gula aren (palm sugar) might be used for a better aroma.

The texture of the kue bangkit is very crispy and tends to be brittle. The dough is molded using small cookie molds, and subsequently the cookies being baked using oven. Eating this cake will give the sensation of melting in the mouth. However, the texture remains crispy when chewed. Kue bangkit has a sweet and savory flavour.

See also

Kue satu
Kue lidah kucing
Kue
List of cookies
List of Indonesian dishes
List of Indonesian snacks
Malaysian Cuisine
Meringue

References

External links

 Kue bangkit recipes
 Kue bangkit video recipe on Youtube

Cookies
Kue
Malaysian cuisine